Victoria Hospital is a public health care facility in Saint Lucia. It is located in Castries. The hospital opened in 1887.

It was once the main hospital of the island but has since been replaced by the Owen King European Union Hospital (OKEU)

References

Buildings and structures in Castries
Hospitals established in 1887
Hospital buildings completed in 1887
Hospitals in Saint Lucia
1887 establishments in the British Empire